Synaphea brachyceras is a shrub endemic to Western Australia.

It blooms between August and October producing yellow flowers.

It is found on flats and gentle slopes amongst scrubby bushland in a small area in the Wheatbelt region of Western Australia between Wagin and Williams where it grows in sandy-gravelly soils over laterite.

References

Eudicots of Western Australia
brachyceras
Endemic flora of Western Australia
Plants described in 2000